The UK Albums Chart is one of many music charts compiled by the Official Charts Company that calculates the best-selling albums of the week in the United Kingdom. Since 2004 the chart has been based on the sales of both physical albums and digital downloads. This list shows albums that peaked in the Top 10 of the UK Albums Chart during 2012, as well as albums which peaked in 2011 and 2013 but were in the top 10 in 2012. The entry date is when the album appeared in the top 10 for the first time (week ending, as published by the Official Charts Company, which is six days after the chart is announced).

One hundred and sixty-three albums were in the top 10 this year. Seventeen albums from 2011 remained in the top 10 for several weeks at the beginning of the year. Halcyon by Ellie Goulding debuted this year but its peak position was not until two years later in 2014. Eighteen artists scored multiple entries in the top 10 in 2012. Carly Rae Jepsen, Emeli Sandé, Little Mix, Nicki Minaj and Rita Ora were among the many artists who achieved their first UK charting top 10 album in 2012.

+ by Ed Sheeran, returned to the top spot in the first week of 2012. The first new number-one album of the year was Born to Die by Lana Del Rey. Overall, thirty-five different albums peaked at number-one in 2012, with Bruno Mars and Rihanna (2) having the joint most albums hitting that position.

Background

Multiple entries
One hundred and sixty-three albums charted in the top 10, with one hundred and forty-four albums reaching their peak this year (including All Over the World: The Very Best of Electric Light Orchestra, Number Ones, Sigh No More, Teenage Dream, The Seldom Seen Kid and Whitney: The Greatest Hits, which charted in previous years but reached a peak on their latest chart run).

In 2012 18 artists scored multiple entries in the top 10. Adele, Bruno Mars, Cheryl, Elbow, Electric Light Orchestra, Green Day, Military Wives, Mumford & Sons, Olly Murs, One Direction, Rihanna, The Vaccines and Whitney Houston were the acts who had two top 10 albums this year. Cheryl (one album with Girls Aloud as well as a solo release), Green Day and Military Wives' two entries were both released this year, with All Over the World: The Very Best of Electric Light Orchestra by Electric Light Orchestra, Sigh No More by Mumford & Sons, The Seldom Seen Kid by Elbow and Whitney: The Greatest Hits by Whitney Houston, all returning after making the top 10 before.

Chart debuts
Thirty-seven artists achieved their first top 10 album in 2012 as a lead artist.

The following table (collapsed on desktop site) does not include acts who had previously charted as part of a group and secured their first top 10 solo album, or featured appearances on compilations or other artists recordings.

Notes
Blunderbuss by Jack White was the singer's debut solo release, however he had previous chart success with The White Stripes and The Raconteurs. Dappy took some time away from his group N-Dubz, scoring a number 6 album Bad Intentions.

Best-selling albums
Emeli Sandé had the best-selling album of the year with Our Version of Events. The album spent 67 weeks in the top 10 (including 10 weeks at number 1), sold over 2.3 million copies and was certified 8× Platinum by the BPI. 21 by Adele came in second place. Ed Sheeran's +, Born to Die from Lana Del Rey and Take Me Home by One Direction made up the top five. Albums by Mumford & Sons, Olly Murs, Michael Bublé, Coldplay and Rihanna were also in the top 10 best-selling albums of the year.

Top-ten albums
Key

Entries by artist

The following table shows artists who achieved two or more top 10 entries in 2012, including albums that reached their peak in 2011. The figures only include main artists, with featured artists and appearances on compilation albums not counted individually for each artist. The total number of weeks an artist spent in the top 10 in 2011 is also shown.

{| class="wikitable sortable" style="text-align: center;"
|-
! scope="col" style="width:55px;" data-sort-type="number"| Entries
! scope="col" style="text-align:center;"| Artist
! scope="col" style="width:55px;"| Country of origin
! scope="col" style="width:55px;" data-sort-type="number"| Weeks
! scope="col" style="width:300px;"| Albums
|-
|rowspan="13"|2
|Adele
|
| 28
|19, 21
|-
|Bruno Mars
|
| 8
|Doo-Wops & Hooligans, Unorthodox Jukebox
|-
|Cheryl
|rowspan="3"|
| 3
|A Million Lights, Ten
|-
|Elbow
| 2
|Dead in the Boot, The Seldom Seen Kid
|-
|Electric Light Orchestra
| 3
|All Over the World: The Very Best of Electric Light Orchestra, Mr. Blue Sky: The Very Best of Electric Light Orchestra
|-
|Green Day
|
| 3
|¡Dos!, ¡Uno!
|-
|Military Wives
|rowspan="4"|
| 4
|In My Dreams, Stronger Together|-
|Mumford & Sons
| 8
|Babel, Sigh No More|-
|Olly Murs
| 9
|In Case You Didn't Know, Right Place Right Time|-
|One Direction
| 8
|Take Me Home, Up All Night|-
|Rihanna
|
| 18
|Talk That Talk, Unapologetic|-
|
|
| 5
|Come of Age, What Did You Expect from The Vaccines?|-
|Whitney Houston
|
| 2
|The Essential Whitney Houston, Whitney: The Greatest Hits|}

Notes

 Doo-Wops & Hooligans re-entered the top 10 at number 2 on 7 January 2012 (week ending) for six weeks.
 21 re-entered the top 10 at number 9 on 14 July 2012 (week ending) and at number 7 on 27 July 2012 (week ending) for four weeks.
 Who You Are re-entered the top 10 at number 10 on 7 January 2012 (week ending) for two weeks, at number 10 on 28 January 2012 (week ending) for six weeks, at number 5 on 7 April 2012 (week ending) for six weeks, at number 7 on 16 June 2012 (week ending) and at number 7 on 25 August 2012 (week ending).
 What Did You Expect from the Vaccines re-entered the top 10 at number 6 on 21 January 2012 (week ending) for three weeks.
 4 re-entered the top 10 at number 6 on 14 January 2012 (week ending) for three weeks.
 Nothing but the Beat re-entered the top 10 at number 9 on 11 February 2012 (week ending) for two weeks and at number 9 on 24 March 2012 (week ending) for seven weeks.
 + re-entered the top 10 at number 8 on 26 May 2012 (week ending) and at number 2 on 16 June 2012 (week ending) for 13 weeks.
 Every Kingdom originally peaked at number 7 upon release in 2011. It re-entered the top 10 at number 6 on 26 May 2012 (week ending) for two weeks. It also re-entered the top 10 at number 4 on 2 March 2013 (week ending) for two weeks, reaching a new peak.
 Mylo Xyloto re-entered the top 10 at number 6 on 3 March 2012 (week ending) for three weeks, at number 7 on 31 March 2012 (week ending) for two weeks, at number 5 on 16 June 2012 (week ending), at number 7 on 14 July 2012 (week ending) for two weeks and at number 4 on 22 September 2012 (week ending) for two weeks.
 Noel Gallagher's High Flying Birds re-entered the top 10 at number 8 on 21 January 2012 (week ending) and at number 9 on 4 February 2012 (week ending) for two weeks.
 Velociraptor! re-entered the top 10 at number 9 on 21 January 2012 (week ending).
 Ceremonials re-entered the top 10 at number 8 on 28 January 2012 (week ending) for two weeks and at number 9 on 3 March 2012 (week ending) for two weeks.
 Stereo Typical re-entered the top 10 at number 9 on 28 January 2012 (week ending) for three weeks.
 Talk That Talk re-entered the top 10 at number 9 on 9 June 2012 (week ending) for ? weeks, at number 9 on 7 July 2012 (week ending) for two weeks, at number 6 on 28 July 2012 (week ending) for seven weeks.
 Up All Night re-entered the top 10 at number 10 on 25 August 2012 (week ending).
 In Case You Didn't Know re-entered the top 10 at number 7 on 5 May 2012 (week ending) for two weeks.
 Heaven re-entered the top 10 at number 10 on 25 February 2012 (week ending), at number 6 on 19 May 2012 (week ending) for two weeks and at number 5 on 27 October 2012.
 Born to Die re-entered the top 10 at number 6 on 21 April 2012 (week ending) for five weeks and at number 8 on 24 November 2012 (week ending).
 Our Version of Events re-entered the top 10 at number 10 on 8 June 2013 (week ending).
 Making Mirrors re-entered the top 10 at number 8 on 19 May 2012 (week ending) for two weeks.
 Whitney: The Greatest Hits originally peaked at number 1 upon its initial release in 2000. It re-entered the top 10 following the death of Whitney Houston.
 19 originally peaked at number 1 upon its initial release in 2008. It re-entered the top 10 at number 9 on 25 February 2012 (week ending) for three weeks.
 Teenage Dream re-entered the top 10 at number 6 on 7 April 2012 (week ending), having originally peaked at number-one upon release in 2010.
 California 36 re-entered the top 10 at number 9 on 28 July 2012 (week ending) and at number 7 on 18 August 2012 (week ending).
 Strangeland re-entered the top 10 at number 10 on 18 August 2012 (week ending).
 Some Nights re-entered the top 10 at number 8 on 8 September 2012 (week ending), at number 4 on 10 November 2012 (week ending), at number 10 on 12 January 2013 (week ending) and at number 9 on 2 February 2013 (week ending).
 Number Ones (Bee Gees) originally peaked at number 7 upon its initial release in 2004.
 Fall to Grace re-entered the top 10 at number 5 on 18 August 2012 (week ending) for five weeks, at number 9 on 3 November 2012 (week ending) for three weeks, at number 9 on 26 January 2013 (week ending) and at number 10 on 2 March 2013 (week ending).
 Graceland: 25th Anniversary Edition re-entered the top 10 at number 6 on 14 July 2012 (week ending) for three weeks
 Life in a Beautiful Light re-entered the top 10 at number 4 on 25 August 2012 (week ending).
 Watch the Throne re-entered the top 10 at number 7 on 7 July 2012 (week ending) for two weeks.
 ill Manors re-entered the top 10 at number 7 on 8 September 2012 (week ending) for four weeks.
 The Seldom Seen Kid originally peaked at number 5 upon its initial release in 2008.
 Ora re-entered the top 10 at number 8 on 5 January 2013 (week ending) for two weeks.
 The Truth About Love re-entered the top 10 at number 10 on 22 December 2012 (week ending) for two weeks and at number 10 on 16 March 2013 (week ending) for 10 weeks.
 Babel re-entered the top 10 at number 5 on 23 February 2013 (week ending) for five weeks and at number 1 on 13 July 2013 (week ending) for four weeks.
 Sigh No More first entered the top 10 in 2010 and reached its peak of number two in 2011. It re-entered the top 10 at number 10 on 6 October 2012 (week ending), the same week Babel debuted at number 1.
 All Over the World: The Very Best of Electric Light Orchestra originally peaked at number 6 upon its initial release in 2005.
 Halcyon re-entered the top 10 at number 10 on 9 February 2013 (week ending), at number 9 on 8 June 2013 (week ending), at number 3 on 7 September 2013 (week ending) for two weeks, at number 6 on 28 December 2013 (week ending) for 13 weeks, at number 10 on 26 July 2014 (week ending) for two weeks and at number 7 on 16 August 2014 (week ending).
 Jake Bugg re-entered the top 10 at number 4 on 13 January 2013 (week ending) for nine weeks and at number 5 on 6 July 2013 (week ending) for five weeks.
 Red re-entered the top 10 at number 8 on 19 January 2013 (week ending) and at number 7 on 2 March 2013 (week ending).
 18 Months re-entered the top 10 at number 7 on 5 January 2013 (week ending) for seven weeks, at number 8 on 4 May 2013 (week ending) for two weeks, at number 8 on 27 July 2012 (week ending) and at number 8 on 24 August 2013 (week ending) for two weeks.
 Take Me Home re-entered the top 10 at number 8 on 2 February 2013 (week ending).
 Storyteller re-entered the top 10 at number 9 on 15 December 2012 (week ending).
 Unapologetic re-entered the top 10 at number 10 on 13 April 2013 (week ending).
 Christmas (Michael Buble) originally peaked at number 1 upon its initial release in 2011. It re-entered the top 10 at number 5 on 1 December 2012 (week ending) for six weeks.
 Right Place Right Time re-entered the top 10 at number 7 on 16 March 2013 (week ending), at number 9 on 15 June 2013 (week ending), at number 8 on 29 June 2013 (week ending) for three weeks and at number 4 on 7 December 2013 (week ending) for five weeks.
 Unorthodox Jukebox'' re-entered the top 10 at number 7 on 23 February 2013 (week ending) for 12 weeks, at number 7 on 8 June 2013 (week ending) and at number 9 on 6 July 2013 (week ending) for four weeks.
 Figure includes a top  10 album with the group Girls Aloud.
 Figure includes album that peaked in 2011.

See also
2012 in British music
List of number-one albums from the 2010s (UK)

References
General

Specific

External links
2012 album chart archive at the Official Charts Company (click on relevant week)

United Kingdom top 10 albums
Top 10 albums
2012